Port Griffith is an unincorporated community found within the Greater Pittston metropolitan area of Jenkins Township, Luzerne County, Pennsylvania, United States.

Geography
Port Griffith is located at  (41.310914, -75.810472) in the Greater Pittston Area of Jenkins Township. Its elevation is 643 feet (196 m). Port Griffith can be found bordering the Susquehanna River.

History
On January 22, 1959, a cave-in occurred at the Knox Coal Mine in Greater Pittston's Port Griffith. Twelve people died, 69 others escaped. One miner, Amadeo Pancotti, was awarded the Carnegie Medal for leading 32 miners to safety. The bodies of the twelve who died were never recovered, despite efforts of divers and an attempt to pump the water out of the mining shafts. The Knox Mine Disaster essentially shut down the mining industry in Northeastern Pennsylvania.

References

External links
 Knox Mine Disaster at Mine Country History

Unincorporated communities in Luzerne County, Pennsylvania